Expedition Medicine (sometimes known as expeditionary medicine) is the field of medicine focusing on providing embedded medical support to an expedition, usually in medically austere or isolated areas. Expedition medicine provides the physical and psychological wellbeing of expedition members before, during, and after an expedition. Expedition medicine may be practiced in support of commercial, non-governmental organizations, and government expeditions. Some medical governing bodies consider expedition medicine as a field within wilderness medicine, whilst others considered it be a separate discipline.

History 
This field of expedition medicine has ancient origins and has been practised almost since the advent of medicine and expeditions. Many ancient civilizations embedded medical staff with military units.

During the Age of Discovery, expedition medicine planning became more integral to explorers on land and sea, especially in the prevention of scurvy.  Many explorers, to include Cristopher Columbus, traveled with surgeons as part of their crew.

Benjamin Rush provided medical training and equipment to the Lewis and Clark Expedition.

During the period of American settlement in the early 19th century, expeditionary medicine preparedness and support became standard concerns for wagon trains.
 
In the late 19th century, the influence of notable medical practitioners like Friedrich von Esmarch and members of the Venerable Order of Saint John pushing for every adult man and woman to be taught the basics of first aid eventually led to institutionalized first-aid courses and standard first-aid kits in the military and eventually in other medically austere locations.

Modern advances, such as the use of remote physiological monitoring devices, have allowed expedition medicine providers to monitor and treat medical situations quickly.

See also 
 Wilderness Medicine
 History of Medicine
 Battlefield medicine

References

External links

Medical emergencies
Wilderness medical emergencies
Wilderness medicine